Nost may refer to:

People
 John Nost (died 1729), Flemish sculptor
 John Nost Sartorius (1755–1828), English painter
 John van Nost the younger, English sculptor

Other
 Nost, an album by German musician Ellen Allien

See also
 Nøst (disambiguation)